Chiavenna railway station is a railway station in Italy. Located at the end of Colico–Chiavenna railway, with trains from and to Milano Porta Garibaldi and Colico railway station, it serves the town of Chiavenna.

Services
Chiavenna is served by the lombard railway company Trenord.

References

External links

Railway stations in Lombardy